In mathematics, a binary relation R ⊆ X×Y between two sets X and Y is total (or left total) if the source set X equals the domain {x : there is a y with xRy }. Conversely, R is called right total if Y equals the range {y : there is an x with xRy }.

When f: X → Y is a function, the domain of f is all of X, hence f is a total relation. On the other hand, if f is a partial function, then the domain may be a proper subset of X, in which case f is not a total relation.

"A binary relation is said to be total with respect  to a universe of discourse just in case everything in that universe of discourse stands in that relation to something else."

Algebraic characterization
Total relations can be characterized algebraically by equalities and inequalities involving compositions of relations.

  is total iff for any set  and any   implies 
  is total iff 
 If  is total, then  The converse is true if 
 If  is total, then  The converse is true if 
 If  is total, then  The converse is true if 
 More generally, if  is total, then for any set  and any   The converse is true if

Notes

References

 Gunther Schmidt & Michael Winter (2018) Relational Topology
 C. Brink, W. Kahl, and G. Schmidt (1997) Relational Methods in Computer Science, Advances in Computer Science, page 5, 
 Gunther Schmidt & Thomas Strohlein (2012)[1987] 
 Gunther Schmidt (2011) 

Binary  relations